AP-3 complex subunit delta-1 is a protein that in humans is encoded by the AP3D1 gene.

Function 

AP3D1 is a subunit of the AP3 adaptor-like complex, which is not associated with clathrin. The AP3D1 subunit is implicated in intracellular biogenesis and trafficking of pigment granules and possibly platelet dense granules and neurotransmitter vesicles.[supplied by OMIM]

Interactions 

AP3D1 has been shown to interact with SYBL1.

References

External links

Further reading